The 1989 Jeux de la Francophonie, also known as Iers Jeux de la Francophonie, (French for Francophone Games) were held in Casablanca and Rabat, Morocco, from 8 to 22 July 1989.

Sports

Medals & Participation

Total

The following participating nations didn't win any medal.

External links
  Medal winners 1989 at jeux.francophonie.org 
 Medal tables at jeux.francophonie.org 

 
J
International sports competitions hosted by Morocco
Jeux de la Francophonie
Jeux de la Francophonie
Multi-sport events in Morocco